John Mutai (born 26 May 1966) is a Kenyan long distance runner.

Career 

Mutai received much media attention following his three successive victories at the Belfast Marathon, including from the BBC, who called the victories a "hat-trick". His other notable race results are:
Fourth in the Great Capital Run in 2007.
First in the Edinburgh Marathon in 2004, second in 2005.
BUPA great north run half marathon 2002 5
7 in the BUPA Great South Run 2001
First in the Standard Chartered Marathon (Singapore)
Great North Run winner 1999

References 

1966 births
Living people
Kenyan male long-distance runners